Eupithecia cingulata is a moth in the  family Geometridae. It is found in Turkmenistan.

References

Moths described in 1885
cingulata
Moths of Asia